Balkello Hill is a hill in Angus, Scotland. It is the third highest hill of the Sidlaw range and is visible from Sidlaws View Trail. Balkello Hill is located near Auchterhouse and is smaller than both Auchterhouse Hill & Craigowl Hill.

References

Mountains and hills of Angus, Scotland